The Gauteng Roller Hockey League is the biggest Roller Hockey Clubs Championship in South Africa.

Participated Teams in the last Season
The clubs that competed in the season of 2010 are ACPP, APF JUV, União de Joanesburgo,
APF, Sporting, Nucleo, Sporting B.

List of Winners

Number of Championships by team

External links

South African websites
 South African Roller Hockey Federation
Associação Portuguesa de Futebol Cultura e Recreio (APFCR)

International
 Roller Hockey links worldwide
 Mundook-World Roller Hockey
Hardballhock-World Roller Hockey
Inforoller World Roller Hockey 
 World Roller Hockey Blog
rink-hockey-news - World Roller Hockey
HoqueiPatins.cat - World Roller Hockey

Roller hockey in South Africa
Sport in Gauteng
Sports competitions in South Africa